Monodontides cara is a butterfly of the family Lycaenidae. It is found on Sulawesi.

References

, 1898. On new and little-known butterflies from the Indo-Malayan, Austro-Malayan and Australian Regions. The Journal of the Bombay Natural History Society 12: 131–160, 4 pls.
 , 1983. Blue Butterflies of the Lycaenopsis Group: 1–309, 6 pls. London.
, 1917. Revision der Lycaenidengattung Lycaenopsis. Arch. Naturgesch. 82 (A) (1) (1916): 1-42, 2 pls.
, 1922. In Seitz, A., Die Gross-Schmetterlinge der Erde 9, Gattungen Megisba, Lycaenopsis, Pithecops. pp. 857–881. Stuttgart.

Monodontides
Butterflies described in 1898
Butterflies of Indonesia
Taxa named by Lionel de Nicéville